The following are towns and cities in the island archipelago, Socotra.

Socotra
 Hadibu
 Qalansiyah
 Qād̨ub
 Qashio
 Jo'oh
 Da'ira
 Steroh
 Mori
 Nait
 Di Asmo
 Erissel
 Ghubbah
 Suq

Abd al Kuri
 Kinshia
 Kilmia

See also
Google Maps: Socotra

Socotra archipelago
Socotra
Socotra